Sixteen Rivers Press is a shared-work, nonprofit poetry collective that provides an alternative publishing avenue for San Francisco Bay Area poets.

History
Founded in 1999 by poets Valerie Berry, Terry Ehret, Margaret Kaufman, Jacqueline Kudler, Diane Lutovich, Carolyn Miller, and Susan Sibbet as a shared-work, nonprofit poetry collective dedicated to providing an alternative publishing avenue for San Francisco Bay Area poets. Sixteen Rivers Press was modeled after the Alice James Books collective, a Boston-area regional press created in the 1970s. Named for the sixteen rivers that flow into San Francisco Bay, the press publishes books by poets residing in the Greater Bay Area region.

Sixteen Rivers Press continues as one of the longest-running and most successful collective presses in the United States, having published thirty collections of poetry. Its authors have won prizes in poetry and translation, National Endowment for the Arts and other grants, honors in various genres, and have published books with other presses—in poetry, fiction, architecture, education, psychology, and other nonfiction.

Press operations

Editorial structure
Sixteen Rivers Press chooses manuscripts via an annual “blind” selection competition, the collective's membership participating in that selection. Poets whose manuscripts are chosen for book publication commit to working with the press for a term of three years, their book appearing during the second year of that term. Many writers have chosen to stay active in the press past the requisite three-year term.

Although the press operates with a nonprofit board, it uses a consensus model of decision-making.

Funding
Sixteen Rivers Press is a US 501(c)(3) not-for-profit corporation. The press employs no paid staff. Money to publish new books comes primarily from sales of the previous year's books, augmented by donations, grants, and fundraisers.

Since 2005, through the generosity of particular supporters and featured poets, Sixteen Rivers has held annual fundraiser evenings. Featured poets at those fundraisers have been Philip Levine, Eavan Boland, Al Young, Ilya Kaminsky, Brenda Hillman, Robert Hass, Jane Hirshfield, Mark Doty, Kay Ryan, and Camille Dungy.

In 2009 and 2012, Sixteen Rivers Press was recognized by the National Endowment for the Arts with Access to Artistic Excellence grants. Grants have also come from The Koret Foundation, The Whitney Foundation, Yellow House Foundation, and others.

Special projects
In 2007, Sixteen Rivers Press released a CD, featuring poetry read by poets published by the press prior to that year.

In 2009, Sixteen Rivers Press released , a wide-ranging anthology of poems by non-members that explores different aspects of life within the San Francisco Bay Area and that area's effect on poets’ lives and consciousness. Former United States Poet Laureate Robert Hass wrote the foreword to the volume. The anthology is currently in its third printing.

In 2011, Sixteen Rivers Press initiated its Under Forty chapbook series, a publication competition for writers under the age of forty. The first chapbook selected was Judy Halebsky’s . The second was Miriam Bird Greenberg's .

In 2013, Sixteen Rivers Press published its first book of translations,  by French writer Ito Naga, translated by the author and press member Lynne Knight.

Members

Nonprofit Board Members
Current Sixteen Rivers Press Nonprofit Board Members include Margaret Kaufman, Lynne Knight, Jacqueline Kudler, and Carolyn Miller.

Advisory board members
Current Sixteen Rivers Press Advisory Board members include Marjorie Agosin, Francisco X. Alarcón, Gillian Conoley, Ellen Dudley, Kathleen Fraser, Ruth Gundle, Brenda Hillman, Jane Hirshfield, Marie Howe, Joyce Jenkins, Diana O'Hehir, Kay Ryan, David St. John, Eleanor Wilner, and Al Young.

Collective Members
Current active Sixteen Rivers Press collective members include Valerie Berry, Stella Beratlis, Barbara Swift Brauer, Beverly Burch, Terry Ehret, Gerald Fleming, Margaret Kaufman, Lynne Knight, Jacqueline Kudler, Rosa Lane, Nina Lindsay, Carolyn Miller, Lisa Robertson, Erin Rodoni, Murray Silverstein, Jeanne Wagner, Gillian Wegener, and Helen Wickes.

Book sales
Sixteen Rivers Press titles are available from the press itself, Small Press Distribution, online outlets in the United States and internationally, and traditional bookstores.

Titles
 Sixteen Rivers Press (eds.), America, We Call Your Name: Poems of Resistance and Resilience, Foreword by Camille T. Dungy, 2018, 
 Sixteen Rivers Press (eds.), The Place That Inhabits Us: Poems of the San Francisco Bay Watershed, Foreword by Robert Hass, April 2010, 
 Sixteen Rivers Press, Naming the Rivers: Poets of Sixteen Rivers Press 1999-2008. Features the recordings of sixteen Sixteen Rivers Press authors reading their own work
 Dan Bellm, Practice, 2008, ; ebook edition, 2012
 Maria M. Benet, Mapmaker of Absences, 2005, 
 Stella Beratlis, Alkali Sink, 2015, 
 Valerie Berry, difficult news, 2001, 
 Barbara Swift Brauer, 2013, At Ease in the Borrowed World, 
 Beverly Burch, 2014, How a Mirage Works, 
 Terry Ehret, Lucky Break, 2008, 
 Terry Ehret, Translations From the Human Language, 2001, 
 Gerald Fleming, The Choreographer, 2013, 
 Gerald Fleming, Swimmer Climbing onto Shore, 2005, 
 Miriam Bird Greenberg, All night in the new country, 2013, 
 Judy Halebsky, Space/Gap/Interval/Distance, 2012, ; ebook edition, 2012
 Christina Hutchins, The Stranger Dissolves, 2011, ; ebook edition, 2012
  Margaret Kaufman, Inheritance, April 2010, 
  Margaret Kaufman, Snake at the Wrist, 2002, 
 Lynne Knight, Again, 2009, 
 Jacqueline Kudler, Easing into Dark, 2012, ; ebook edition, 2012
 Jacqueline Kudler, Sacred Precinct, 2003, ; ebook edition, 2012
  Nina Lindsay, Today’s Special, 2007, 
  Diane Sher Lutovich, In the Right Season, 2005, 
  Diane Sher Lutovich, What I Stole, 2003, 
  Carolyn Miller, Light, Moving, 2009, 
  Carolyn Miller, After Cocteau, 2002, 
  Sharon Olson, The Long Night of Flying, 2006, 
  Lisa Robertson, Orbit of Known Objects, 2015, 
  Susan Sibbet, No Easy Light, 2004, 
  Murray Silverstein, Any Old Wolf, 2006, 
  Murray Silverstein, Master of Leaves, 2014, 
  Lynn Lyman Trombetta, Falling World, 2004, 
  Jeanne Wagner, In the Body of Our Lives, 2011, 
  Gillian Wegener, The Opposite of Clairvoyance, 2008, 
  Helen Wickes, In Search of Landscape, 2007, 
  Helen Wickes, World as You Left It, 2015,

References

External links
 The Sixteen Rivers Press website

Non-profit organizations based in San Francisco
Poetry organizations
American poetry
Book publishing companies based in San Francisco
Publishing companies established in 1999
1999 establishments in California